This was the first edition of the event.

Victoria Azarenka won the title, defeating Marion Bartoli in the final 6–3, 6–1.

Seeds

Draw

Finals

Top half

Bottom half

Qualifying

Seeds

Qualifiers

Lucky loser
  Julie Coin

Qualifying draw

First qualifier

Second qualifier

Third qualifier

Fourth qualifier

External links
 Official results archive (ITF)
 Official results archive (WTA)

2009 WTA Tour
Women's Singles